Caught Inside is a 2010 Australian thriller directed by Adam Blaiklock and produced by Paul S. Friedmann. The film stars Ben Oxenbould, Daisy Betts, Harry Cook (actor), & Peter Phelps; Damien Wyvill as the cinematographer. Caught Inside was also produced under the names Locked In and The Hedonist.

Premise
Surfing charters are meant to be a trip to Paradise... With 7 male surfers stuck on a boat, there's bound to be some friction – but when two of the boys are replaced at the last minute with two gorgeous girls – the heat is turned way up! The one 'single girl' on board – SAM – enjoys the attention. She soon has them all wrapped around her finger, as she challenges surf legend "BULL" in being 'the Alpha Male' on board. But The Bull decides to make a forceful move on Sam. Archie's loyalty is torn – between Bull and the group, as the others beat and abandon Bull on an island, but soon the ever-determined Bull returns..! It's soon a life-and-death struggle on board the yacht, as the five imprisoned friends – Archie, Sam, Toobs, Rob and Alex – must survive the fury of the psycho at the helm. When everything goes horribly wrong – their "dream trip" turns into a nightmare battle of wits, love and survival.

Cast
Ben Oxenbould as Bull
Daisy Betts as Sam
Sam Lyndon as Rob
Simon Lyndon as Toobs
Peter Phelps as Skipper Joe
Harry Cook as Archie Cox
Leeanna Walsman as Alex

Critical reception
The movie was praised by critics, holding an 86% fresh rating from Rotten Tomatoes.

References

External links 
 
 

2010 films
2010 action thriller films
Australian action adventure films
2010s English-language films
2010s Australian films